The list of shipwrecks in 1831 includes ships sunk, foundered, grounded, or otherwise lost during 1831.

January

February

March

April

May

June

July

August

September

October

November

December

Unknown date

References

1831